The National Conference of Black Mayors (NCBM) was incorporated in 1974 and was originally organized as the  Southern Conference of Black Mayors (SCBM) forty years ago. The thirteen mayors who founded the group were elected after the enactment of the Civil Rights Act of 1964 and the Voting Rights Act of 1965 and held its first meeting in Santee, South Carolina.

Three significant black mayors elected after the Civil and Voting Rights acts were: Carl Stokes of Cleveland, Ohio; Kenneth Gibson of Newark, New Jersey; and Richard G. Hatcher, of Gary, Indiana. In 1973, Atlanta, Georgia, elected Maynard Jackson the first black mayor of a major southern U.S. city. By 2005, nearly every large U.S. city had a black mayor within the previous 30 years.

In April 1990, Unita Blackwell was elected the first woman president of the association. She was the first black woman mayor in Mississippi in 1976 when elected the mayor of Mayersville. In November 2013, 138 black women were U.S. mayors.

In later years, the NCBM suffered from financial difficulties, and filed for bankruptcy in early 2014 after the controversial tenure of Kevin Johnson, then mayor of Sacramento, as NCBM president. Johnson sought to make major changes at NCBM, then left the group along with a number of other mayors to form a new mayor's group, the African American Mayors Association (AAMA). By the end of 2016, the bankruptcy cases were decided and the AAMA purchased the NCBM's assets and naming rights.

Notable members
 Marion Barry, president, Washington, D.C.
 Unita Blackwell, president, Mayersville, Mississippi
 Charles Evers, founding member SCBM, Fayette, Mississippi
 Johnny Ford, president, Tuskegee, Alabama
 Clarence Lightner, charter member, Raleigh, North Carolina
James L. Usry, president, Atlantic City, New Jersey
Wellington E. Webb, president, Denver, Colorado
Kevin Johnson, president, Sacramento, California

See also

United States Conference of Mayors

References

External links
 National Conference of Black Mayorsformer website
  Conference of Black Mayors (CBM)successor organization
 African American Mayors Association (AAMA)successor organization

Government-related professional associations in the United States
Organizations established in 1974
Organizations disestablished in 2016